Children of Chaos may refer to:

Children of Chaos (T99 album), 1992
Children of Chaos (Soulidium album), 2007